Konina is a rural locality (a village) in Leninskoye Rural Settlement, Kudymkarsky District, Perm Krai, Russia. The population was 9 as of 2010.

Geography 
Konina is located 25 km south of Kudymkar (the district's administrative centre) by road. Sidorshor is the nearest rural locality.

References 

Rural localities in Kudymkarsky District